Bolesław Drobner (born 28 June 1883 in Kraków, died 31 March 1968 in Kraków) was a Polish politician. A member of the Polish Socialist Party, he supported cooperation with the communists. Arrested by the NKVD after the Soviet invasion of Poland, in 1943 he was released. Drobner joined a pro-Soviet Polish communist organization the Union of Polish Patriots and later the Polish Committee of National Liberation (PKWN). As leader of the "Lublin Poles", he led a delegation to Żagań on 13 May 1945 where he pledged allegiance of his town to the Soviet Union.

In 1945 Drobner became the first Polish mayor (president) of Wrocław (former Breslau) and was deputy to State National Council and then to Polish Sejm (national legislature). He was a senior marshal of the latter institution in 1957, 1961 and 1965.

He was also a notable supporter of the artistic group Piwnica pod Baranami.

References

1883 births
1968 deaths
Politicians from Kraków
People from the Kingdom of Galicia and Lodomeria
Polish Austro-Hungarians
Polish Social Democratic Party of Galicia politicians
Polish Socialist Party politicians
Independent Socialist Labour Party politicians
Polish United Workers' Party members
Members of the State National Council
Members of the Polish Sejm 1947–1952
Members of the Polish Sejm 1952–1956
Members of the Polish Sejm 1957–1961
Members of the Polish Sejm 1961–1965
Members of the Polish Sejm 1965–1969
Mayors of Wrocław
Members of the Executive of the Labour and Socialist International
Polish people detained by the NKVD